Rock Starve is The Bags' debut album, released in 1987 by Restless Records.

Though preceded by early releases of "Try It" and "Egg" — songs found on the multiple-artist compilation, Crawling from Within — the album features re-recorded versions.

Critical reception
Billboard recommended the album, writing that the band "mashes up a more than acceptable brand of home-brewed thrash on its palpitating debut disk." Trouser Press wrote that "the Bags demonstrate a singular ability to analyze and describe relationships and emotions with searing but subtle simplicity ... The album doesn’t contain a bad tune."

Track listing

References

1987 debut albums